The 1961 election for Mayor of Los Angeles took place on April 4, 1961, with a runoff election on May 31, 1961. Incumbent Norris Poulson was defeated by Sam Yorty, a former U.S. Representative.

Municipal elections in California, including Mayor of Los Angeles, are officially nonpartisan; candidates' party affiliations do not appear on the ballot.

Election 
Poulson ran for re-election for a third term after a movement to "draft" Poulson for a next term. In January 1961, former U.S. Representative Sam Yorty entered the race, criticizing Poulson for his handling of smog and taxes in Los Angeles. Patrick D. McGee, a member of the Los Angeles City Council, also announced his run for mayor. Both Yorty and McGee had talked about rumors surrounding Poulson that said that he had throat cancer, which Poulson denied. In the primary election, Poulson and Yorty advanced to the runoff election. In the runoff, Yorty defeated Poulson in the election, which some newspapers said was because Poulson "could not make a good public appearance."

Results

Primary election

General election

References and footnotes

External links
 Office of the City Clerk, City of Los Angeles

1961
Los Angeles
Los Angeles mayoral election
Mayoral election
Los Angeles mayoral election
Los Angeles mayoral election